Bình Đại is a rural district of Bến Tre province in the Mekong Delta region of Vietnam. As of 2003 the district had a population of 131,813, growing from 129,446 in 2001. The district covers an area of 381 km². The district capital lies at Bình Đại.

Administrative divisions
The district is divided into one township, Bình Đại (capital), and the following communes:

Tam Hiệp 
Long Định
Long Hòa
Phú Thuận
Châu Hưng
Vang Quới Tây
Vang Quới Đông
Thới Lai
Phú Vang
Lộc Thuận
Định Trung
Phú Long
Bình Thới
Thạnh Trị
Đại Hòa Lộc
Bình Thắng
Thạnh Phước
Thừa Đức
Thới Thuận

References

Districts of Bến Tre province